= Missouri Virtual Instruction Program =

Location
- P.O. Box 480; 205 Jefferson Street; Jefferson, Missouri 65102-0480; United States

Information
- Type: Online learning
- Established: 2007
- School board: Missouri Department of Elementary and Secondary Education
- Administrator: Curt Fuchs
- Grades: K-12
- Website: https://www.movip.org/

Missouri Virtual Instruction Program is an online accredited school program in the state of Missouri which includes grades K-12. The service has been offered since 2007.

== History ==
The program first launched in August 2007 and had approximately 2,000 students. Students interact with certified teachers through e-mail, instant messenger, and telephone.

MoVIP is accessible 24 hours a day, 7 days a week, and offers courses for medically fragile students or for any other student who wishes to take courses online. Students can take up to six courses per sementser.

Each student's schedule is based on a 20-week pace chart which includes two flex weeks where no work is assigned.

MoVIP has no limit on the number of students that can enroll. Tuition is charged.
